The 2006 UNCAF U-16 Tournament was the 1st UNCAF U-16 Tournament, a biennial international football tournament contested by men's under-16 national teams.  Organized by UNCAF, the tournament took place in Nicaragua between 13 and 18 February 2006.

The matches were played at Estadio Cacique Diriangén.  Six Central American teams took part of the tournament, playing each other in a round-robin format.  Belize did not send a team.  Costa Rica won the tournament.

Venue

Final standings

Results

Goalscorers
 3 goals:

  William Maldonado
  Marco Ureña
  Ángelo Padilla

2 goals:

  Luis Quintanilla
  Daniel Reyes
  Jorge Castro
  Roger Rojas

1 goal:

  Alberto Quesada
  Christian Valencia
  David Aroche
  Herbert Sosa
  José Figueroa
  Diego Brenes
  Jessy Peralta
  Xavier Flores
  Javier de La Rosa
  Julio Ibarra
  Santos Banegas
  Armando Polo
  Erick Zepeda

References

External links
UNCAF Official Website

2006
2006 in youth association football
2005–06 in Nicaraguan football
2006